Corey Daniel LaJoie (born September 25, 1991) is an American professional stock car racing driver. He competes full-time in the NASCAR Cup Series, driving the No. 7 Chevrolet Camaro ZL1 for Spire Motorsports and part-time in the NASCAR Craftsman Truck Series, driving the No. 7 Chevrolet Silverado for Spire Motorsports. LaJoie is the son of two-time NASCAR Busch Series champion Randy LaJoie. He was formerly a development driver for Richard Petty Motorsports.

Racing career
LaJoie started his racing career in 1996, competing in kart racing events; winning 19 times on both dirt and asphalt tracks. He moved in 2003 to the INEX Bandolero series, scoring twelve wins and winning the series' Summer Shootout Championship. LaJoie began racing Legends cars in 2005, and in 2006 moved to the Aaron's Pro Challenge Series, where he won 10 of 12 races that year.

Between 2007 and 2009, LaJoie competed in the UARA-Stars Late Model Touring Series; scoring one win and ten top-ten finishes in 17 starts in the series. In 2009, he made his debut in the NASCAR Camping World East Series at Thompson Speedway; LaJoie remained in the series through the 2012 season, scoring his first win in the series in June 2012 at Bowman Gray Stadium; He scored four additional wins over the course of the season, finishing the year second in points.

LaJoie, who had been named to the 2012 NASCAR Next class of up-and-coming drivers, entered the 2013 season with only a limited schedule planned, including selected NASCAR Nationwide Series races for Tommy Baldwin Racing, however in June it was announced that he had signed with Richard Petty Motorsports as a development driver, with plans to run in the Nationwide Series later that year. In addition, LaJoie ran a limited schedule in the ARCA Racing Series in the second half of 2013, winning his first start of the year, and second career start, at Chicagoland Speedway in July, and then in his next race at Pocono Raceway in August.

In November 2013, it was announced that LaJoie would make his NASCAR Nationwide Series debut at Homestead-Miami Speedway that month, driving the No. 9 Ford for Richard Petty Motorsports. He was involved in an accident during the race and finished 34th.

In June 2014, LaJoie joined Biagi-DenBeste Racing to drive five races, starting at Kentucky. LaJoie struggled in these races, crashing in three of them. In September 2014, LaJoie made his Sprint Cup Series debut in the Sylvania 300 at Loudon, racing for Randy Humphrey Racing.

LaJoie returned to NASCAR in 2016, driving the No. 24 Toyota Camry for JGL Racing in the Xfinity Series at Atlanta Motor Speedway.

In 2017, LaJoie returned to the Cup Series and signed with BK Racing, driving the No. 83 Camry part-time. LaJoie made the Daytona 500 controversially, as he got into the left rear of Reed Sorenson about halfway through the first Can-Am Duel, which resulted in Sorenson hitting the inside wall and retiring from the race. Many were led to believe that LaJoie wrecked Sorenson on purpose to get into the 500, although LaJoie denied doing so. LaJoie initially competed for points in the Cup series with BK Racing but switched to Xfinity at the last race.

In 2018, LaJoie moved from BK Racing to TriStar Motorsports for a part-time schedule, splitting the No. 72 with Cole Whitt. LaJoie entered the 2018 season with high hopes in the Daytona 500, and qualified 32nd for the 500, but unfortunately blew an engine on lap nine. He made his second start for the team at ISM Raceway in March, once again blowing an engine early in the race. In the Coca-Cola 600, LaJoie went as high as eighth but finished 26th. At year’s end, TriStar shut down, throwing LaJoie out of his part-time ride.

LaJoie joined Go Fas Racing's No. 32 Ford in 2019. For the 2019 Daytona 500, Go Fas Racing made headlines by placing a picture of LaJoie's face on the No. 32 car as part of Old Spice's sponsorship. LaJoie finished 18th after blowing a right-front tire just 20 laps into the race. He scored two top tens during the year with a sixth at Daytona's Coke Zero Sugar 400 and seventh at Talladega's 1000Bulbs.com 500.

He returned to the No. 32 for 2020 on a one-year contract extension. In the Daytona 500, LaJoie impacted an airborne Ryan Newman coming to the finish, denting LaJoie's windshield and knocking the wind out of him; LaJoie, who finished eighth, was ultimately uninjured while Newman was briefly hospitalized. On August 21, LaJoie announced that he will part ways with Go Fas Racing at the end of the 2020 season.

LaJoie moved to Spire Motorsports' No. 7 on a multi-year agreement beginning in 2021. LaJoie missed the FireKeepers Casino 400 due to COVID-19 protocols; LaJoie was close to a person testing positive for COVID-19 from his Stacking Pennies podcast studio while he was unvaccinated at the time.

On March 15, 2022, crew chief Ryan Sparks was suspended for four races due to a tire and wheel loss during the 2022 Ruoff Mortgage 500 at Phoenix. At Atlanta, LaJoie led a career-best 19 laps and was on his way to claiming his first career win with two laps to go when Chase Elliott overtook him and blocked him on the high side, causing him to brush the wall and spin before colliding with Kurt Busch and finishing the race in 21st place.

Since 2020, LaJoie has been represented by Athelo Group, a sports agency based out of Stamford, Connecticut.

Controversies
After a tweet sent on October 15, 2013 with content deemed racially stereotypical, NASCAR put LaJoie on indefinite probation and required him to go through sensitivity training.

Trying to make the 2017 Daytona 500 as an Open team with BK Racing (no starting spot guaranteed), LaJoie was turning his first laps at Daytona International Speedway during the Can-Am Duels due to practice being rained out. Trailing Reed Sorenson, the only other Open driver, with under fifteen laps to go, LaJoie spun out Sorenson in the tri-oval, ensuring himself a spot in the 500 and making Paul Menard start at the back of the field as Menard was also involved in the crash and had to start in a backup car. After the race, LaJoie said that "I do feel bad" and that "if that was my mom, I'd probably spin her out to make the Daytona 500 too." Sorenson was incensed after the incident, calling the crash "moronic" and "pretty crappy" while saying that LaJoie could have hurt somebody with reckless driving.

Personal life
LaJoie is a Christian. His father, Randy LaJoie, is a two-time NASCAR Busch Series champion, winning the series title in 1996 and 1997.

LaJoie was a host of Motor Racing Network's Sunday Money podcast alongside Daryl Motte and MRN's Lauren Fox, talking about racing and current events; LaJoie and Fox were classmates in high school. In 2021, he began hosting his own podcast Stacking Pennies on NASCAR.com.

Motorsports career results

NASCAR
(key) (Bold – Pole position awarded by qualifying time. Italics – Pole position earned by points standings or practice time. * – Most laps led.)

Cup Series

Daytona 500

Xfinity Series

Craftsman Truck Series

 Season still in progress
 Ineligible for series points
 LaJoie began the 2017 season racing for Cup Series points but switched to Xfinity Series points before the race at Homestead–Miami Speedway

K&N Pro Series East

Whelen Modified Tour

Whelen Southern Modified Tour

ARCA Racing Series
(key) (Bold – Pole position awarded by qualifying time. Italics – Pole position earned by points standings or practice time. * – Most laps led.)

References

External links
 
 Official profile at Spire Motorsports
 

Living people
1991 births
People from Kannapolis, North Carolina
Racing drivers from Charlotte, North Carolina
Racing drivers from North Carolina
NASCAR drivers
American Christians
ARCA Menards Series drivers